The San Jose Stealth are a lacrosse team based in San Jose, California playing in the National Lacrosse League (NLL). The 2005 season was the 2nd in franchise history.

The Stealth finished 2nd in the West in 2004, but did not fare so well in 2005. They started with a 3-2 record, beating division rivals Calgary, Colorado, and Arizona, but then lost 10 of their last 11 games to finish 4-12 and last place overall.

Regular season

Conference standings

Game log
Reference:

Player stats
Reference:

Runners (Top 10)

Note: GP = Games played; G = Goals; A = Assists; Pts = Points; LB = Loose Balls; PIM = Penalty minutes

Goaltenders
Note: GP = Games played; MIN = Minutes; W = Wins; L = Losses; GA = Goals against; Sv% = Save percentage; GAA = Goals against average

Awards

Transactions

Trades

Roster
Reference:

See also
2005 NLL season

References

San Jose
San Jose Stealth